IA4 may refer to:

 Iowa's 4th congressional district
 Iowa Highway 4
 an unofficial backronym for Intel's 4-bit processor architecture
 Ice Age: Continental Drift, also known as Ice Age 4.

fr:IA4